Kathleen Jones may refer to:
Kathleen Jones (writer), English poet, biographer, and fiction writer
Kathleen Jones (academic) (1922–2010), British professor of social policy
Kathleen de Leon Jones (born 1977), Filipino-Australian actress and singer
Kathleen Lloyd Jones (1898–1978), Welsh-born garden designer and nurserywoman